In modular arithmetic computation, Montgomery modular multiplication, more commonly referred to as Montgomery multiplication, is a method for performing fast modular multiplication.  It was introduced in 1985 by the American mathematician Peter L. Montgomery.

Montgomery modular multiplication relies on a special representation of numbers called Montgomery form. The efficiency comes from avoiding expensive division operations. This division requires quotient digit estimation and correction. In practice,  is always a power of two, since division by powers of two can be implemented by bit shifting.

The need to convert  and  into Montgomery form and their product out of Montgomery form means that computing a single product by Montgomery multiplication is slower than the conventional or Barrett reduction algorithms.  However, when performing many multiplications in a row, as in modular exponentiation, intermediate results can be left in Montgomery form. Then the initial and final conversions become a negligible fraction of the overall computation.  Many important cryptosystems such as RSA and Diffie–Hellman key exchange are based on arithmetic operations modulo a large odd number, and for these cryptosystems, computations using Montgomery multiplication with  a power of two are faster than the available alternatives.

Modular arithmetic 

Let  denote a positive integer modulus.  The quotient ring  consists of residue classes modulo , that is, its elements are sets of the form

where  ranges across the integers. Equality of residue classes is called congruence and is denoted

Storing an entire residue class on a computer is impossible because the residue class has infinitely many elements. Instead, residue classes are stored as representatives. When writing congruences, it is common to identify an integer with the residue class it represents. With this convention, the above equality is written .

Arithmetic on residue classes is done by first performing integer arithmetic on their representatives. The output of the integer operation determines a residue class, and the output of the modular operation is determined by computing the residue class's representative. In this case, that integer is 5, so .

Montgomery form 

However, the product  is in the range . Mathematically, the integer between 0 and  that is congruent to  can be expressed by applying the Euclidean division theorem:

Because the computation of  requires division, it is undesirably expensive on most computer hardware.  Montgomery form is a different way of expressing the elements of the ring in which modular products can be computed without expensive divisions.  While divisions are still necessary, they can be done with respect to a different divisor .  This divisor can be chosen to be a power of two, for which division can be replaced by shifting, or a whole number of machine words, for which division can be replaced by omitting words.  These divisions are fast, so most of the cost of computing modular products using Montgomery form is the cost of computing ordinary products.

The auxiliary modulus  must be a positive integer such that . For computational purposes it is also necessary that division and reduction modulo  are inexpensive, and the modulus is not useful for modular multiplication unless . For example, suppose that  and that .

Addition and subtraction in Montgomery form are the same as ordinary modular addition and subtraction because of the distributive law:

For example, which in Montgomery form becomes .

Multiplication in Montgomery form, however, is seemingly more complicated.

So for instance, the product of the Montgomery forms of 7 and 15 modulo 17 is the product of 3 and 4, which is 12.

Removing the extra factor of  can be done by multiplying by an integer  such that , that is, by an  whose residue class is the modular inverse of  mod .  Then, working modulo ,

It can be constructed using the extended Euclidean algorithm. The extended Euclidean algorithm efficiently determines integers  and  that satisfy Bézout's identity:

This shows that it is possible to do multiplication in Montgomery form.

The extended Euclidean algorithm implies that , so . Multiply 12 by 8 to get 96 and reduce modulo 17 to get 11. This is the Montgomery form of 3, as expected.

The REDC algorithm 

Dividing the result by  yields a much smaller number. This number is so much smaller that it is nearly the reduction modulo , and computing the reduction modulo  requires only a final conditional subtraction.
 function REDC is
            Integer N′ in  such that ,
            Integer T in the range .
     output: Integer S in the range  such that 
 
     m ← ((T mod R)N′) mod R
     t ← (T + mN) / R
     if t ≥ N then
         return 
     else
         return t
     end if
 end function

A number is divisible by  if and only if it is congruent to zero mod , and we have:

Therefore,  is an integer. Modulo ,  satisfies:

Therefore, the output has the correct residue class. Therefore, reducing  into the desired range requires at most a single subtraction, so the algorithm's output lies in the correct range.

To use REDC to compute the product of 7 and 15 modulo 17, first convert to Montgomery form and multiply as integers to get 12 as above. Notice that  is 1100, a multiple of 100 as expected.   is set to 11, which is less than 17, so the final result is 11, which agrees with the computation of the previous section.

Using the extended Euclidean algorithm, compute , so  will be . Their product 28 is the input  to REDC, and since , the assumptions of REDC are satisfied. Then , so .

Arithmetic in Montgomery form 

Many operations of interest modulo  can be expressed equally well in Montgomery form. Addition, subtraction, negation, comparison for equality, multiplication by an integer not in Montgomery form, and greatest common divisors with  may all be done with the standard algorithms.

When , most other arithmetic operations can be expressed in terms of REDC. The combined operation of multiplication and REDC is often called Montgomery multiplication.

Conversion into Montgomery form is done by computing . Conversion out of Montgomery form is done by computing .

The fundamental operation is to compute REDC of a product.

Montgomery arithmetic on multiprecision integers 

Most cryptographic applications require numbers that are hundreds or even thousands of bits long.  Such numbers are too large to be stored in a single machine word.  Typically, the hardware performs multiplication mod some base , so performing larger multiplications requires combining several small multiplications.  The base  is typically 2 for microelectronic applications, 28 for 8-bit firmware, or 232 or 264 for software applications.

The REDC algorithm requires products modulo , and typically  so that REDC can be used to compute products. The algorithm begins with a multiprecision integer  and reduces it one word at a time.

 function MultiPrecisionREDC is
            Integer ,     --thus, r = logB R
            Integer N′ in  such that ,
            Integer T in the range , stored as an array of  words.
 
     Output: Integer S in  such that , stored as an array of p words.
 
     Set   (extra carry word)
     for  do
         --loop1- Make T divisible by 
 
         c ← 0
         m ← 
         for  do
 
             x ← 
             T[i + j] ← 
             c ← 
         end for
         for  do
             --loop3- Continue carrying
 
             x ← 
             T[i + j] ← 
             c ← 
         end for
     end for
 
     for  do
         S[i] ← T[i + r]
     end for
 
     if  then
         return 
     else
         return 
     end if
 end function
The final comparison and subtraction is done by the standard algorithms.

The above algorithm is correct for essentially the same reasons that REDC is correct. Because MultiPrecisionREDC and REDC produce the same output, this sum is the same as the choice of  that the REDC algorithm would make.

It follows that this extra carry word can be avoided completely if it is known in advance that . Otherwise, the carry will be either zero or one. Depending upon the processor, it may be possible to store this word as a carry flag instead of a full-sized word.

It is possible to combine multiprecision multiplication and REDC into a single algorithm.  This combined algorithm is usually called Montgomery multiplication.  Several different implementations are described by Koç, Acar, and Kaliski.  The algorithm may use as little as  words of storage (plus a carry bit).

Compute . The initial input  to MultiPrecisionREDC will be [6, 4, 8, 5, 6, 7]. The number  will be represented as [7, 9, 9]. The extended Euclidean algorithm says that , so  will be 7.

 i ← 0
 m ← 
 
 j T       c
 - ------- -
 0 0485670 2    (After first iteration of first loop)
 1 0485670 2
 2 0485670 2
 3 0487670 0    (After first iteration of second loop)
 4 0487670 0
 5 0487670 0
 6 0487670 0
 
 i ← 1
 m ← 
 
 j T       c
 - ------- -
 0 0087670 6    (After first iteration of first loop)
 1 0067670 8
 2 0067670 8
 3 0067470 1    (After first iteration of second loop)
 4 0067480 0
 5 0067480 0
 
 i ← 2
 m ← 
 
 j T       c
 - ------- -
 0 0007480 2    (After first iteration of first loop)
 1 0007480 2
 2 0007480 2
 3 0007400 1    (After first iteration of second loop)
 4 0007401 0

Therefore, before the final comparison and subtraction, . The final subtraction yields the number 50.

When working in base 2, determining the correct  at each stage is particularly easy: If the current working bit is even, then  is zero and if it's odd, then  is one.  Furthermore, because each step of MultiPrecisionREDC requires knowing only the lowest bit, Montgomery multiplication can be easily combined with a carry-save adder.

Side-channel attacks 

Because Montgomery reduction avoids the correction steps required in conventional division when quotient digit estimates are inaccurate, it is mostly free of the conditional branches which are the primary targets of timing and power side-channel attacks; the sequence of instructions executed is independent of the input operand values.  The only exception is the final conditional subtraction of the modulus, but it is easily modified (to always subtract something, either the modulus or zero) to make it resistant.  It is of course necessary to ensure that the exponentiation algorithm built around the multiplication primitive is also resistant.

See also 
 Barrett reduction

References

External links
 

Computer arithmetic
Cryptographic algorithms
Modular arithmetic